Southampton station may refer to:

In Southampton, England:
Southampton Central railway station
Southampton Airport Parkway railway station
Southampton Terminus railway station

In the United States:
Southampton (LIRR station), in Southampton, New York, USA
Southampton station (Pennsylvania), a former railroad station in Southampton, Pennsylvania, USA

See also
Southampton (disambiguation)